Laura Gutiérrez Sáenz de Santa María (born 18 April 2000), known as Laurina, is a Spanish footballer who plays as a midfielder for Real Betis.

Club career
Laurina started her career at Real Oviedo.

References

External links
Profile at La Liga

2000 births
Living people
Women's association football midfielders
Spanish women's footballers
People from Gozón
Footballers from Asturias
Real Oviedo (women) players
Real Betis Féminas players
Primera División (women) players
Segunda Federación (women) players